Preston & Barbieri is an amusement ride manufacturing company based in Reggio Emilia, Italy. The company was founded in 2000 as a merger of the Preston and Barbieri Rides companies. The company manufactures a wide range of flat rides, water rides and roller coasters out of its  property in Italy.

History
In 1954, Barbieri Rides was formed by the Barbieri brothers. In 1986, Preston was formed by a team of managers from various local companies. As the two companies were both based in Reggio Emilia and manufacturing similar attractions, they merged in 2000 to form Preston & Barbieri.

Preston & Barbieri is based in Emilia-Romagna, an administrative district of Italy. This district has been home to a collection of amusement ride manufacturing firms over the years, many of which have links to the company. S.D.C. was founded by Walter Spaggiari, Mack Duce and Giancarlo Casoli. It manufactured several roller coasters and amusement rides. Among the rides, S.D.C. manufactured bumper cars which were attributed as the creations of Spagiari, Duce, and Barbieri. The company went bankrupt in 1993, with the rights for their rides being bought by other Italian firms C&S, S&MC, and Zamperla. S&MC and L&T Systems were established by former S.D.C. workers, with both companies remaining in the Emilia-Romagna area. L&T Systems ultimately disbanded in 2009, with Preston & Barbieri purchasing the rights to their rides.

Preston & Barbieri has also collaborated directly with other companies to design rides including 3DBA for Splash Battles, and D.P.V. Rides for family roller coasters, among others.

List of roller coasters

As of 2019, Preston & Barbieri has built 27 roller coasters around the world.

List of other attractions

References

External links

 

Amusement ride manufacturers
Roller coaster manufacturers
Manufacturing companies of Italy
Companies based in Reggio Emilia
Italian companies established in 2000
Manufacturing companies established in 2000